Legislative elections were held in Mongolia on 29 June 2016. The governing Democratic Party lost to a landslide victory of the Mongolian People's Party, retaining only 9 of 76 seats in the Great Khural. While they just lost under 2% of the popular vote, a new electoral law passed by the Democratic Party itself when in Government to promote two-party politics, together with a 14% rise of the MPP, ended up making them lose 25 of 34 seats. As a result, the MPP secured a supermajority with 65 of 76 seats.

Electoral system
In the 2012 elections the 76 members of the State Great Khural were elected by two methods; 48 are elected from single-member constituencies and 28 from a nationwide constituency by proportional representation. However, on 5 May 2016 the electoral law was amended to remove the proportional representation seats. The changes were expected to marginalise smaller parties, and also removed the right of 150,000 Mongolians expatriates to vote, as they could not be registered in a specific constituency.

The winning candidate had to receive at least 28% of the valid vote to be elected; if not, a by-election would be held. Voter turnout had to be at least 50% in a constituency for the result to be valid.

Campaign
Twelve parties were approved to contest the elections. However, the Civil Will–Green Party, which won two seats in 2012 and was part of the government coalition, was barred from running due to irregularities in its paperwork. The newly-formed National Labour Party was also prevented from running, with its leader Surenkhuu Borgil planning on standing as an independent instead.

A total of 498 candidates registered to contest the elections, with the Democratic Party and Mongolian People's Party being the only parties to contest all 76 seats.

Results

The 239 votes cast for the MPRP candidate in constituency 11 (Gobi-Altai) and the 595 votes cast for an independent candidate in constituency 58 (Khan-Uul) were annulled.

References

Elections in Mongolia
Mongolia
Legislative
Mongolia